Nebrija University is a private university based in Madrid, Spain, named after Antonio de Nebrija. It has operated since 1995, and is headquartered in the Nebija-Princesa building in Madrid.

Organization

The university has 7 schools, and online programs.
The university offers degree programs in education sciences, law, political science, economics, engineering, psychology.
There is a library, traditional and electronic (to the virtual library, students can access at any time).

Presidents and rectors

Presidents
Manuel Villa Cellino

Rectors
The Rector is the highest academic authority.
José Muñiz Fernández

References

External links

 

1995 establishments in Spain
Universities in Madrid
Educational institutions established in 1995
Private universities and colleges in Spain